Helland Brothers was a fiddle makers' shop in Chippewa Falls, Wisconsin, United States, 19051927.

The workshop was founded in 1905 by the brothers Knut Gunnarsson Helland and Gunnar Gunnarsson Helland from Bø in Telemark. They emigrated to America in 1901 and made both Hardanger fiddles and violins. Knut died, supposedly of typhoid fever in 1920. Gunnar Gunnarson Helland ran the workshop alone until 1927, when it was closed due to the failure of the fiddle market.

See also 
 The Helland fiddle maker family
Knute Helland did not die of typhoid fever. He died following appendectomy surgery.
Note his death certificate -

Knute Helland's death certificate from the original..

PLACE OF DEATH						STATE OF WISCONSIN
									
County Chippewa,						Department of health – Bureau of Vital Statistics
Township___				ORIGINAL CERTIFICATE OF DEATH
	or								
Village_					            Registered No. 84
	or
City	Chippewa Falls  (No St. Joseph's Hospital Ward)
	2 FULL NAME Knute Helland

PERSONAL AND STATISTICAL PARTICULARS

3 SEX		4 COLOR OR RACE 5
   Male			White	Married	
6 Date of birth

   Nov. 6th  1881  (Error)(1880)
	Month Day Year
7 AGE
38 yrs 6  mon 21 day 
 
8 OCCUPTION (Not given)
9 BIRTHPLACE
     Norway
10 Name of Father
	Gunnar Helland
11 BIRTHPLACE OF FATHER
	Norway
12 MAIDEN NAME OF MOTHER
	Gunhild
13 BIRTH PLACE OF MOTHER
	Norway
14 THE ABOVE IS TRUE TO THE BEST OF MY
KNOWLEDGE Nellie Helland 			
Chippewa Falls
 15  July 1919  F. J. McHugh
	      1919 F.J. McHugh

MEDICAL CERTIFICATE OF DEATH
16 DATE OF DEATH
	JUNE 27,           1919
	Month	  Day	       Year
17 I HEREBY CERTIFY, That I attended deceased from June 22, 1919 to June 27, 1919
That I last saw him alive on June 27, 1919
And that death occurred on the date stated above, at 4 p.m.

THE CAUSE OF DEATH was as follows:
Paralysis of the bowls following
Acute appendicitis open 3 wks
before, & second open 2 days ago (.......) yrs __wk ___dys.
Contributory ptomaine poisoning from Ice cream (....)___yrs ___wks 3 days
(Signed) H. William ___191__(Address) Chippewa. Falls, Wis

18 LENGTH OF RESIDENCE
	(Not given)
19 PLACE OF BURIAL	DATE OF BURIAL
        Forest Hill	June 29, 1919

20 UNDERTAKER
Mr. P. Hogseth	Chipp. Falls

Lew Holt
Salem, Oregon

External links
The Helland fiddle maker family

Musical instrument manufacturing companies of the United States
Fiddle makers